These are the RPM magazine Dance number one hits of 1999.

Chart history

See also
1999 in music
List of RPM number-one dance singles chart (Canada)

References

1999 in Canadian music
Canada Dance
Dance 1999
RPM electronic dance music chart
Dance music